The 2015–16 Azadegan League was the 25th season of the Azadegan League and 15th as the second highest division since its establishment in 1991. The season featured 15 teams from the 2014–15 Azadegan League, two new teams relegated from the 2014–15 Persian Gulf Pro League: Paykan and Naft Masjed Soleyman and two new teams promoted from the 2014–15 League 2: Aluminium Arak as champions and Kheybar Khorramabad. Khooneh be Khooneh replaced Bahman Shiraz while Machine Sazi replaced Shahrdari Tabriz. The league started on 17 August 2015 and ended on 16 May 2016. Paykan won the Azadegan League title for the second time in their history. Paykan, Machine Sazi and Sanat Naft promoted to the Persian Gulf Pro League.

Teams

Stadia and locations

Number of teams by region

League table

Results

Clubs season-progress

Attendance

Average home attendance

Highest attendance

Notes:Updated to games played on 16 May 2016. Source: lig1.ir

See also
 2015–16 Persian Gulf Pro League
 2015–16 Iran Football's 2nd Division
 2015–16 Iran Football's 3rd Division
 2015–16 Hazfi Cup
 Iranian Super Cup
 2015–16 Iranian Futsal Super League

References

Azadegan League seasons
Iran
2015–16 in Iranian football leagues